Fighting to Live is a 1934 American Pre-Code western film directed by Edward F. Cline.

Cast
Marion Shilling as Mary Carson
Steve Pendleton as John Z. Blake
Lafayette Russell as Reb Collins, Mail-Coach Driver
Eddie Phillips as Joe Gilmore
Lloyd Ingraham as Judge Simmons
Henry Hall as Endicott
John Ince as Jake - Prosecuting Attorney
Bruce Mitchell as Charlie, the Bailiff

External links
 
 

1934 films
American black-and-white films
Films directed by Edward F. Cline
Films produced by Sol Lesser
1930s English-language films
1934 Western (genre) films
American Western (genre) films